QuintessenceLabs Pty Ltd. (or QuintessenceLabs) is a cybersecurity company headquartered in Canberra, Australia with offices in San Jose, California. QuintessenceLabs produces encryption key and policy management products that conform to the Key Management Interoperability Protocol (KMIP), as well as a hardware random number generator, development of a quantum key distribution (QKD) system, and other encryption solutions that include automatic key zeroization.

The company was founded in 2008 by Dr Vikram Sharma, following research on quantum technology conducted at The Australian National University by Sharma, Thomas Symul, Andrew Lance and Ping Koy Lam.

Westpac Group, a major investor, extended two rounds of funding to QuintessenceLabs in 2015 and 2017, respectively.

In July 2017, QuintessenceLabs received a grant of AU$3.26M from the Australian Department of Defence's Innovation Hub to develop a free-space quantum key distribution system.

References

External links 
 Company website
 Quantum key to unbreakable cryptography
 First Look: QuintessenceLabs Trusted Security Foundation (TSF)
 Prime Minister Malcolm Turnbull’s Address to SINET61
 The random number generator powered by the quantum 'crackle in the universe’
 KMIP Implementations known to the KMIP TC
 The Future of Cybersecurity Is in High-Speed Quantum Encryption
 IBM warns of instant breaking of encryption by quantum computers
 Time to invest in skills for quantum computing revolution

Quantum cryptography
Software companies of Australia
Random number generation